Foneria is a Barcelona Metro station opened on 8 September 2018, operated by TMB. The metro station is located in  Zona Franca, a neighborhood of the Barcelona municipality. The station serves line L10 and is located between Provençana  and  Foc stations in the southern part of the city. The station is located underneath the Passeig de la Zona Franca.

References

External links

Barcelona Metro line 10 stations
Railway stations in Spain opened in 2018
2018 establishments in Catalonia